The 1973 Central American and Caribbean Championships in Athletics were held at the Estadio José Pachencho Romero in Maracaibo, Venezuela between 26–29 July.

Medal summary

Men's events

Women's events

Medal table

External links
Men Results – GBR Athletics
Women Results – GBR Athletics

Central American and Caribbean Championships in Athletics
Central American and Caribbean Championships
International athletics competitions hosted by Venezuela
Central American And Caribbean Championships In Athletics, 1973
Sports competitions in Maracaibo